Warlencourt British Cemetery is a Commonwealth War Graves Commission burial ground for military personnel who died on the Western Front during the First World War. It is located in the Pas de Calais region of France. Established in 1919 to consolidate several smaller cemeteries, it was designed by Sir Edward Lutyens and is administered by the Commonwealth War Graves Commission. There are 3,450 soldiers interred, over which 1,823 are unidentified. There are also memorials to 55 soldiers whose graves are unknown. The majority of the soldiers who have been identified are British, with smaller numbers of Australians, South Africans, New Zealanders, and Canadians.

History
The village of Warlencourt, in the commune of Warlencourt-Eaucourt, is southeast of Bapaume and the area saw extensive fighting at various stages from late 1916 to early 1918, during the Battle of the Somme, the Spring Offensive, and the Hundred Days Offensive.

Foundation
The cemetery was established in late 1919 to receive the remains from other, smaller, cemeteries in the area as they were consolidated here. The consolidated cemeteries included the Hexham Road Cemetery, in Le Sars, which contained men who died during the period November 1916 to October 1917.

Cemetery
Designed by the English architect Sir Edward Lutyens and administered by the Commonwealth War Graves Commission, the Warlencourt British Cemetery is located on the D929, a road running between Bapaume and Amiens.

The main entrance is along the northwest wall. At the far end of the cemetery, opposing the entrance, a Cross of Sacrifice is located. A Stone of Remembrance is positioned along the northeast wall and on the wall itself, is a memorial to 15 soldiers whose graves at Hexham Road Cemetery were destroyed by artillery fire. There is a further memorial to soldiers who graves are believed to be among those unidentified on the opposing southwest wall.
 
The cemetery contains the remains of 3,450 soldiers who died during the First World War, with memorials to another 55 whose graves were lost. Of the interments, 1,823 are unidentified. The 1,683 known burials include 1,189 personnel from the United Kingdom but 339 soldiers of the Australian Imperial Force are also buried at Warlencourt alongside 108 members of the South African Overseas Expeditionary Force. There are also 51 soldiers of the New Zealand Expeditionary Force and two Canadians identified as being interred at the cemetery. A notable burial at Warlencourt is Sergeant Donald Forrester Brown, a Victoria Cross recipient who was killed in action on 1 October 1916.

Notes

References

Commonwealth War Graves Commission cemeteries in France
World War I cemeteries in France
World War I in the Pas-de-Calais
Cemeteries in Pas-de-Calais
Works of Edwin Lutyens in France